Dunleer was a constituency represented in the Irish House of Commons to 1801.

History
In the Patriot Parliament of 1689 summoned by James II, Dunleer was not represented.

Members of Parliament, 1679–1801

1689–1801

Notes

References

Bibliography

Constituencies of the Parliament of Ireland (pre-1801)
Historic constituencies in County Louth
1679 establishments in Ireland
1800 disestablishments in Ireland
Constituencies established in 1679
Constituencies disestablished in 1800